Adriaan Frederik "Aad" Oudt (born 26 February 1946) is a Dutch tax advisor and a former Olympian swimmer. He competed at the 1964 Summer Olympics in the 400 m freestyle and at the 1968 Summer Olympics in the 200 m and 4 × 200 m freestyle. He did not reach the final in either event.

Oudt hoped to graduate as a tax lawyer in 1969.

References

1946 births
Living people
Dutch male freestyle swimmers
Olympic swimmers of the Netherlands
Swimmers at the 1964 Summer Olympics
Swimmers at the 1968 Summer Olympics
Swimmers from The Hague